Chinna Kodur is a Mandal headquarters in Siddipet district of Telangana, India.
The old name of this village is Kodur kurd. 
It is situated around 8 km north from siddipet and 2 km north east from Ranganayaka sagar dam (Part of Kaleshwaram project).

The village has four major water ponds: Peddha cheruvu, Brahmanula cheruvu, Bendla kunta and amma kunta.

Chinna kodur is famous for "Sri sherupalli veeranjaneya swamy temple" which is situated 2 km east to the village.

There are 3 banks in Chinnakodur: Union Bank of India, Andhra Pradesh grameena Vikas bank (APGVB), and District co-operative bank (DCCB).

References 

Mandal headquarters in Siddipet district
Villages in Siddipet district